Brunei competed in the 2015 Southeast Asian Games from 5 to 16 June 2015.

Competitors

Medal summary

Medal by sport

Medal by Date

Medalists

External links

Nations at the 2015 Southeast Asian Games
2015
Southeast Asian Games
Southeast Asian Games